Greece competed with 48 athletes at the 1952 Summer Olympics in Helsinki, Finland. 48 competitors, all men, took part in 24 events in 7 sports. Greek athletes have competed in every Summer Olympic Games.

Athletics

Basketball

Men's Team Competition
Qualification Round (Group B)
 Lost to Hungary (38-75)
 Defeated Israel (54-52)
 Lost to Hungary (44-47) → did not advance

Football

Rowing

Greece had three male rowers participate in one out of seven rowing events in 1952.

 Men's coxed pair
 Iraklis Klangas
 Nikos Nikolaou
 Grigorios Emmanouil (cox)

Sailing

Shooting

Six shooters represented Greece in 1952.

25 m pistol
 Konstantinos Mylonas
 Angelos Papadimas

50 m pistol
 Georgios Stathis

50 m rifle, prone
 Athanasios Aravositas

Trap
 Ioannis Koutsis
 Panagiotis Linardakis

Wrestling

References

External links
Official Olympic Reports

Nations at the 1952 Summer Olympics
1952
Summer Olympics